Nacer Abdellah (born 3 March 1966 in Sidi Slimane) is a retired Moroccan football player. Abdellah started his career in Belgium with KV Mechelen, and played most of his career for Belgian teams. He also made 24 appearances for the Morocco, and played at the 1994 FIFA World Cup in the matches against Belgium and Saudi Arabia.

Just before the 1994 World Cup in the U.S., a statement of Nacer Abdellah lead to controversy. Abdellah said that his former teammate at Cercle Brugge, the Belgian Josip Weber wouldn't score during the tournament.

References
 Cerclemuseum.be 
 

1966 births
Living people
1994 FIFA World Cup players
Belgian Pro League players
CD Ourense footballers
Cercle Brugge K.S.V. players
Expatriate footballers in Belgium
Expatriate footballers in the Netherlands
Expatriate footballers in Spain
FC Den Bosch players
SC Telstar players
Moroccan footballers
Moroccan expatriate sportspeople in Belgium
Moroccan expatriate sportspeople in Spain
Moroccan expatriate sportspeople in the Netherlands
Morocco international footballers
K.V. Mechelen players
Association football defenders
People from Sidi Slimane
Kawkab Marrakech players
K.F.C. Lommel S.K. players